The National Coastwatch Institution  is a voluntary organisation and registered charity providing a visual watch along the UK's coasts, and is not to be confused with HM Coastguard.

History
The National Coastwatch Institution (NCI) was founded in Cornwall in 1994 following the deaths of two local fishermen whose fishing boat sank within sight of a recently closed coastguard station at Bass Point. Most of HM Coastguard's visual watch stations were closed following a period of rationalisation and modernisation.. Although never fully admitted or responsibility accepted by the Maritime and coastguard agency or HM Government,  it is widely speculated within the local community that had the watch keepers' station not been closed due to budget cuts and still staffed then the fisherman in distress would’ve been spotted and assistance sent.  Therefore, the institution, registered charity number 1159975, originated from a campaign to re-establish a visual coastal watch in Cornwall. The first NCI Coastwatch station was thus established at Bass Point, on The Lizard peninsula, Cornwall by November 1994.

Following the successful launch of NCI Bass Point, other stations quickly followed in Devon, Cornwall, East Anglia, Somerset, Sussex, Essex, Dorset, and South Wales. As of August 2021, there are 58 NCI stations operational around the coast of England and Wales, from Fleetwood in the Northwest, through Wales, along the south coast, and up the east coast to Hornsea, East Yorkshire with over 2,600 trained volunteer watchkeepers.

The institution has a joint memorandum of understanding with the Maritime and Coastguard Agency (MCA), and more recently UK Border Force, and these documents are guides to NCI's role and provide the basis for the working relationship the institution enjoys with both these departments. Most NCI stations have acquired, or are working towards acquiring "declared facility status", giving NCI a very important role to play when needed among the UK's search and rescue organisations. Many have also achieved the Queen's Award for Voluntary Service (QAVS).

Work

As of January 2019, the NCI's 2,600-plus uniformed trained volunteer watchkeepers maintain a visual watch along part of the UK coastline with 54 established NCI watch stations. These stations provide a daily visual watch in all weathers, monitoring marine radio channels, sea conditions and weather, using radar and providing a listening watch in poor visibility. All emergencies are reported to the appropriate authorities for action, the majority of NCI work being working mainly with HM Coastguard and other statutory authorities. Most NCI stations are manned on a daily basis providing a regular daily watch from 8:00am to dusk. In 2017 a total of 312,350-man-hours watch was performed by NCI watchkeepers, recording over 232,961 commercial, military and leisure vessel movements, and reporting a total of 498 incidents to HM Coastguard, fire, police and ambulance services, of which 41 were NCI-initiated lifeboat rescues. All this work was carried out at no cost to the public purse.

All volunteers are provided with training in visual observation techniques, marine chart-work, Ordnance Survey mapping, critical reporting, marine radio procedures, and radar, ensuring all volunteers reach the standards expected by the Maritime and Coastguard Agency.

The NCI works with HM Coastguard, the MCA, the RNLI and the other emergency services. In 2007, some of the 498 incidents reported by NCI to the MCA ended with the call-out of the RNLI lifeboats, RAF air-sea rescue, MoD ordnance units, fire, ambulance and other rescue agencies. These incidents included vessels sinking, vessels on fire, vessels in danger and distress, swimmers, surf boarders and kite boarders in difficulties, inflatable toys with children on board being blown out to sea, persons fallen over cliffs, persons washed off jetty, land fires, dangerous munitions washed up, personal injuries, and so on.

In addition, many hundreds of minor incidents were dealt with including informing the coastguard and police of lost, found and missing children, distressed marine wildlife, ordnance on beaches, chemical drums, large carcasses and dangerous debris washed up.

2009 saw the fifteenth anniversary of the foundation of the National Coastwatch Institution. A national office has now been opened in Exeter.

NCI contributes to SAR by maintaining a visual lookout (‘Spot, Plot, Report and Respond’) around the coastline.

All NCI stations have, or are working towards achieving, Declared Facility Status from the Maritime & Coastguard Agency. DFS outlines what MCA expect from NCI stations, this includes the training and skills watchkeepers are expected to have and what equipment lookouts are expected to have. For watchkeepers this includes but is not limited to, understanding VHF Mayday, Pan Pan & Sececurite and the associated procedures, communication protocols for working with SAR assets, observation techniques, plotting and chart work, understanding of emergency beacons and operation of AIS / radar terminals. For stations this includes but is not limited to high power binoculars, VHF Radios, nautical charts, AIS / radar and usually a weather station and CCTV system.

Once a station has achieved DFS it is listed as an asset within the Search and Rescue community.

Structure and uniform

Coastwatch stations
The National Coastwatch Institution maintains 58 operational Coastwatch stations around the coastline of England and Wales, at the following locations:

England

East coast

Caister, Norfolk
East Runton, Cromer, Norfolk
Felixstowe, Suffolk
Gorleston, Great Yarmouth
Herne Bay, Kent
Canvey Island, Essex
Jaywick, Jaywick Sands, Essex
Mundesley, Norfolk
Pakefield, Suffolk
Southend, Essex
Sunderland VLB (affiliate), Tyne & Wear
Skegness, Lincolnshire
Wells-next-the-Sea, Norfolk
Whitstable, Kent

South coast

Bass Point The Lizard, Cornwall
Calshot, Hampshire
Charlestown, St Austell, Cornwall
Exmouth, Devon
Folkestone, Kent
Froward Point, Devon
Gosport, Hampshire
Gwennap Head, St Levan, Cornwall
The Needles and Alum Bay, Isle of Wight
Lee-on-the-Solent, Hampshire
Lyme Bay, Dorset
Newhaven, East Sussex
Penzance, Cornwall
Peveril Point, Swanage, Dorset
Polruan, Cornwall
Portland Bill, Dorset 
Portscatho, Pednvadan Point, Cornwall
Prawle Point, Kingsbridge, Devon
Rame Head, Cawsand, Devon
Torbay, Devon
Shoreham, Sussex
St Alban's Head, Worth Matravers, Swanage, Dorset
Teignmouth, Devon

West coast

Boscastle, Cornwall
Cape Cornwall, St Just, Penzance, Cornwall
Fleetwood - Rossall Point, Lancashire
Nare Point, The Lizard, Helston, Cornwall
St Agnes Head, St Agnes, Cornwall
St Ives, Cornwall
Stepper Point, Padstow, Cornwall

Wales
Aberystwyth, Ceredigion
Great Orme, North Wales
Nells Point, Barry Island, South Wales
Porthdinllaen, North Wales
Rhoscolyn, Ynys Mon, Wales
Worm's Head, Gower Peninsula, South Wales
Wooltack Point, Pembrokeshire

References

External links

 National Coastwatch Institution

 
Sea rescue organisations of the United Kingdom
1994 establishments in the United Kingdom